Diploharpus is a genus of beetles in the family Carabidae, containing the following species:

 Diploharpus ebeninus Bates, 1872 
 Diploharpus exstriatus Bates, 1878 
 Diploharpus laevigatus Perrault, 1992 
 Diploharpus laevissimus Chaudoir, 1850 
 Diploharpus mexicanus (Chevrolat, 1841) 
 Diploharpus perpolitus Bates, 1882 
 Diploharpus rubripes Bates, 1872 
 Diploharpus striolatus Bates, 1872 
 Diploharpus termitophilus Perrault, 1992

References

Lebiinae